The Outstanding Filipino or TOFIL Award is the honor given by the Junior Chamber International (JCI) Philippines to Filipino men and women, 41 years of age and over, whose exemplary achievements are worthy of emulation.  The award was conceived in 1988 to institutionalize the public recognition of these outstanding individuals.

History

JCI Senate Philippines believes that there are a lot of men and women age 41 and over who deserve recognition for their contributions to society. It enlisted the support of Insular Life in an endeavor that would give due recognition to these people. Thus the TOFIL Award was born.

The JCI Senate Philippines is an organization of a select group of Junior Chamber International (JCI) members, who, in recognition of their outstanding achievements and contributions to the JCI movement, have been awarded lifetime membership as JCI Senators. They now number 3,000 in the Philippines. Among them are: a former chief justice, senators, representatives, cabinet secretaries, governors, city mayors, judges, and other government officials; presidents of financial, industrial, commercial, agricultural, and other business enterprises; distinguished doctors, lawyers and other professionals; successful entrepreneurs and community leaders.

Criteria
Nomination for the award is open to every Filipino, natural born, naturalized citizen or bearing dual citizenship (Filipino and a foreign country), at least 41 years of age and of good moral character whose dedication to his/her profession or vocation has made significant contributions to the advancement of his/her calling, public welfare and national development.  Honorees are chosen based on the strength of their character and integrity; and the impact of their achievements on their field of work, public welfare and national development.

TOFIL Awardees
The following is the list of TOFIL awardees from its conception in 1988 to the present:

1988
Edgardo Espiritu, Banking
Cecilia Muñoz-Palma, Public Service
Emmanuel Pelaez, Government Service
Jose B. L. Reyes, Human Rights
Jaime Cardinal Sin, Spiritual Leadership
Lorenzo Tañada, Freedom Advocacy

1989
Marcelo B. Fernan, Judiciary
Jose B. Fernandez, Banking
Lucrecia Kasilag, Arts & Culture
Rosa Rosal, Humanitarian Service

1990
Diosdado Macapagal, Government Service
Ameurfina Melencio-Herrera, Judiciary
Teodoro Locsín Sr., Journalism
Zeneida Amador, Theater

1991
Arturo D. Gorrez, Manufacturing
Manuel P. Manahan, Rural Development
Leonardo S. Sarao, Entrepreneurship
Dioscoro L. Umali, Agricultural Research

1992
Henry R. Canoy, Media
Renato Constantino, History
Edgardo D. Gomez, Science
Jose T. Joya, Visual Arts

1993
Jovito Salonga, Public Service
Jose L. Guevara, Journalism
Francisco Demetrio, SJ, Culture
Antonio Manikan, Humanitarian Service
Jorge Garcia, Medicine & Surgery
Bonifacio Isidro, Science & Technology

1994
Romeo Contemplacion, Rural Medicine
Armando Malay, Journalism/Human Rights
Nicanor Perlas, Agriculture
Dionisio Salazar, Drama/Literature
Benjamin Tayabas, Education

1995
Jose T. Amacio, Cooperative Development
Alfredo S. Buenaventura, Music
Gonzalo O. Catan, Jr., Science & Technology
Crispin C. Maslog, Literature/Journalism
Christian Monsod, Government Service

1996
Irene R. Cortes, Justice and Law (Posthumous Award)
Salvador H. Laurel, Public Service
Richard J. Gordon, Government Service
Onofre R. Pagsanghan, Culture and Arts
Helena Zoila T. Benitez, Education

1997
Raul J. Bonoan, S.J., Education
Fe del Mundo, Medicine
Menardo R. Jimenez, Business/Entrepreneurship
Alfredo S. Lim, Public Service
Estefania Aldaba-Lim, Humanitarian Service
Andrea Veneracion, Culture and Arts

1998
Ramon V. del Rosario Sr., Business
Ricardo Cardinal J. Vidal, Religious Work
Carlos R. Alindada, Public Accounting
Perla D. Santos Ocampo, M.D., Medicine
Bayani F. Fernando, Government Service

1999
Mateo Armando T. Caparas, Community Service
Hilario G. Davide, Jr., Law
Remedios L. Macalincag, Banking & Finance
Amador C. Muriel, Science & Technology
Efren M. Reyes, Sports
Wigberto E. Tañada, Government & Public Service
Pierre T. Tritz, S. J., Education

2000
Corazon C. Santos-de la Paz, Public Accounting
Antolin M. Oreta, Sr., Engineering Practice
Lawrence C. Qua, Technopreneurship
Flerida Ruth P. Romero, Justice/Law
Alfonso T. Yuchengco, Business & Entrepreneurship

2001
James G. Dy, Humanitarian Service
Ceferino L. Follosco, Science, Technology, & Engineering
Fortunata C. Villamar, Education
Jose C. Vitug, Law/Judiciary
Enrique J. Zobel, Business

2002
Feliciano Belmonte, Jr., Government Service
David Consunji, Construction Industry
Emil Q. Javier, Science & Technology
George S.K. Ty, Banking

2003
Robert Kuan, Business & Entrepreneurship
Eva Fidela C. Maamo, M.D., SPC, Community Service
Felicito Payumo, Government Service

2004
Juan C. Acosta, Ph. D., Agriculture
Gelia T. Castillo, Ph. D., Science and Technology
Francisco Mañosa, Architecture
Nelia Cortes-Maramba, M.D., Medicine
Ruben M. Tanseco, S.J., Humanitarian Service

2005
Ben Farrales, Fashion, Arts and Culture
Lauro L. Baja, Jr.,  Bilateral and Multi-lateral Diplomacy
Adolfo B. Bellosillo, M.D., Medicine

2006
Marciano Evangelista, S.D.B., Service Non-Government Organization
Antonio P. Meloto, Humanitarian Service 
Ramon Orlina, Arts
Socorro Ramos, Business

2007
Florangel R. Braid, Ph.D., for Literature and Journalism
Jose S. Concepcion, Jr., for Social Advocacy
Felipe F. Cruz, General Construction
Hernani G. Golez, Ph.D., Agriculture.

2008
Antonio S. Abacan, Jr., Banking
Rustica Carpio, Ph. D., Culture and Arts
Mary Placid Lorna C. Abejo, O.S.B., Music
Rafael D. Guerrero III, Ph. D., Science & Technology
Federico M. Macaranas, Ph. D., Economics

2009
Teotimo Aganon, Ph. D. for Science and Technology;  
Senen C. Bacani, Agriculture
Arturo Cunanan, Jr., M.D., Ph. D., Public Health ; 
Lydia B. Echauz, D.B.A. Education 
Oscar M. Lopez, Business

2010
Ray L. Catague, M.D., Public Health 
Esperanza I. Cabral, M.D., Government Service
Isagani R. Cruz, Literature
Shirley Halili-Cruz, Arts and Culture
Tony Leachon, M.D., Medicine
Joel E. Tabora, S.J., Education

2011
Jesus P. Estanislao, Ph.D., Governance 
Jose T. Pardo, Business
Emerlinda R. Roman, Education 
Sylvia D. Pendon, Entrepreneurship 
Ramon M. Nery, M.D., Government/Public Service

2012
Jose F. Datuin for the Arts;  
Samuel Pagdilao for Military/Police work 
Adolfo S. Azcuna, Justice/Law

2013
Alfredo Lagmay, Geology and Earth Science;  
Rogelio Singson, Governance and Public Service 
Arsenio B. Ella, Environmental Conservation and Sustainable Development

2014
Gemma Cruz-Araneta, Culture & Arts;  
Francis J. Kong, Business Entrepreneurship
Joey Salceda, Government Service

2016
Anton Pascual, Culture & Arts;  
Jose Cuisia Jr., Business Entrepreneurship
William Dar, Government Service

2019
Ramon S. Ang, Business and Entrepreneurship
Glenn Banaguas, Environment Conservation and Science Diplomacy
Joselito R. Chavez, Medicine
Virgilio Malang, Science and Technology
Noel Rosal, Government/Public Service
Nelly Siababa-Aggangan, Agriculture

2020

2021

2022
Persida Acosta, Justice and Law
Maria Catalina Cabral, Government and Public Service
Nemesio Miranda, Visual Arts and Sculpture
Hans T. Sy, Business and Reliance
Ruben Villareal, Agriculture Science

References

External links
TOFIL Official Website
JCI Philippines

Philippines-related lists
Junior Chamber International
Philippine awards